The Special Warfare insignia, also known as the "SEAL Trident" or its popular nickname in the Navy community, "The Budweiser", recognizes those members of the United States Navy who have completed the Basic Underwater Demolition/SEAL (BUD/S) training, completed SEAL Qualification Training (SQT) and have been designated as U.S. Navy SEALs. It is one of the most recognizable breast insignias of the U.S. Navy.

History
Established on 16 October 1970, the Special Warfare insignia was initially issued in two grades: gold for officers and silver for enlisted. In 1978, the silver SEAL insignia was abolished, with the Special Warfare insignia being issued solely in gold thereafter. The SEAL insignia is therefore unusual in the Navy, in that it is one of the very few breast insignia issued identically for both officers and enlisted personnel. This is partly due to the combined training both officers and enlisted men receive, side by side, when involved in BUD/S training.

The Special Warfare insignia consists of an eagle clutching a U.S. Navy anchor, trident, and flintlock-style pistol. This gold badge is considered a successor to the obsolete Underwater Demolition Insignia.

The general design was likely derived from the British Combined Operations badge.

Designator and title
Sailors who complete BUD/S training at Coronado California are reclassified to the Special Warfare Operator (SO) rating. Sailors must complete SEAL Qualification Training (SQT) before receiving Navy Enlisted Classification (NEC) 5326 Combatant Swimmer (SEAL) or, in the case of commissioned naval officers, the designation 1130 Naval Special Warfare (SEAL) Officer. Prior to the establishment of the SO rating in 2006, SEAL operators were sourced from regular Naval ratings, with the title of SEAL treated like a warfare qualification, attaching (SEAL) after the rating.

See also
Special warfare combatant-craft crewmen
List of United States Navy enlisted warfare designations
Badges of the United States Navy
Military badges of the United States
Obsolete badges of the United States military
Uniforms of the United States Navy
List of United States Navy SEALs

Notes

References
 National Archives and Records Administration, Military Personnel Records Center (U.S. Navy Breast Insignia Descriptions)

United States military badges
United States Navy SEALs